Celsiney Ribeiro Pessoa (born 9 September 1981), commonly known as Ney Mineiro, is a Brazilian footballer. He currently plays for São Bernardo in Brazil.

Honours
Juniors Campeonato Carioca (1):
2001
Campeonato Alagoano (1):
2002

External links
 
 

1981 births
São Bernardo Futebol Clube players
Brazilian footballers
Living people
Association football forwards